The 15th Guards Motorized Rifle Shavlinsky Order of Lenin, Red Banner Regiment (15 Guards MSP), is a motor rifle regiment of the Russian Ground Forces of the  Armed Forces of the Russian Federation. Its Military Unit Number 31134 (military unit 31134). It is based in Kalininets (Moscow Oblast). It is part of the 2nd Guards Motor Rifle Division of the Western Military District.

History 
The regiment was created in 1918. By the beginning of the war, it was called the 875th Infantry Regiment of the 127th Rifle Division (1st Formation). During the Great Patriotic War the regiment took part in the 1941 defence of Smolensk, in battles near Kursk, in the liberation of the Taman Peninsula (:ru:Новороссийско-Таманская операция), and the liberation of Ukraine and Lithuania. For its actions during the war it was raised to "Guards" status as the 15th Guards Rifle Regiment. For the liberation of the Lithuanian city of Siauliai during the Šiauliai offensive the regiment received the honorary title "Shavlinsky."

In 1953, the 15th Guards Rifle Regiment was reorganized into the 130th Guards Mechanised Regiment (military unit 73881) of the 23rd Guards Mechanised Division. In 1957, the regiment became the 406th Guards Motor Rifle Regiment, with the creation of motor rifle units and formations.

On 4 May 1990 the regiment reverted to its Second World War number as the 15th Guards Motor Rifle Regiment.

On May 15, 2009, during a military reorganisation, the regiment was disbanded. The regiment was revived in 2013 as part of the 2nd Guards Motor Rifle Division.

Over the entire history of the regiment, more than 600 personnel have been awarded orders and medals, of which more than 250 - Order of Courage.

In March 2022, after the start of the Russian invasion of Ukraine, the soldiers of the regiment refused to participate in hostilities on the territory of Ukraine. After the launch of the invasion it was reported that the regimental commander Colonel Kharitonov was seriously wounded.

Notes

References 
 
 
 

Infantry units and formations of Russia
Infantry regiments
Ground Forces regiments of the Russian Federation
Regiments of the Soviet Union
Mechanized units and formations
Military units and formations established in 1990